JASMS may refer to:
 Journal of the American Society for Mass Spectrometry, a scientific journal
 Jose Abad Santos Memorial School, the Basic Education Division (Nursery to High School) Department of the Philippine Women's University
 Jose Abad Santos Memorial School Quezon City